The Nights of Cornelis Brouwer is a 1921 German silent thriller film directed by Reinhard Bruck and William Wauer and starring Albert Bassermann, Colette Corder and Rudolf Klein-Rogge.The plot, about a respectable citizen who is taken over by a wild other self during nights on the town, is similar to that of Der Andere.

The film's sets were designed by the art director Robert A. Dietrich.

Cast
 Albert Bassermann as Cornelis Brouwer
 Colette Corder as Tänzerin
 Rudolf Klein-Rogge
 Margarete Neff
 Max Wogritsch

References

Bibliography
 Stephen Prince. The Horror Film. Rutgers University Press, 2004.

External links

1921 films
Films of the Weimar Republic
German silent feature films
Films directed by Reinhard Bruck
Films directed by William Wauer
German black-and-white films
1920s German films